One Pendleton Place, also known as the William S. Pendleton House, is a historic home located in the New Brighton neighborhood of Staten Island, New York.  It was built in 1860, and is a three-story, picturesque Italianate villa style frame dwelling with a multi-gabled roof.   It features asymmetrical massing, a four-story conical-roofed entry tower, and multiple porches including a wrap-around verandah.

It was designated a New York City Landmark in 2006, and was listed on the National Register of Historic Places in 2014.

See also
List of New York City Designated Landmarks in Staten Island
National Register of Historic Places listings in Richmond County, New York

References

Houses on the National Register of Historic Places in Staten Island
Italianate architecture in New York (state)
Houses completed in 1860
New York City Designated Landmarks in Staten Island